Felice Varini (born in Locarno in 1952) is a Paris-based, Swiss artist who was nominated for the 2000/2001 Marcel Duchamp Prize. Mostly known for his geometric perspective-localized paintings in rooms and other spaces, using projector-stencil techniques, according to mathematics professor and art critic Joël Koskas, "A work of Varini is an anti-Mona Lisa."
Felice paints on architectural and urban spaces, such as buildings, walls and streets. The paintings are characterized by one vantage point from which the viewer can see the complete painting (usually a simple geometric shape such as circle, square, line), while from other view points the viewer will see 'broken' fragmented shapes. Varini argues that the work exists as a whole - with its complete shape as well as the fragments. "My concern," he says "is what happens outside the vantage point of view."

Carcassonne 
In May 2018, Varini's project "Concentric, eccentric" saw large yellow concentric circles mounted on the monument at Carcassonne as part of the 7th edition of "IN SITU, Heritage and contemporary art", a summer event in the Occitanie / Pyrenees-Mediterranean region focusing on the relationship between modern art and architectural heritage. This monumental work was to celebrate the 20th anniversary of Carcassonne's inscription on the World Heritage List of UNESCO. Exceptional in its size and its visibility and use of architectural space, the exhibit extended on the western front of the fortifications of the city. The work could only be fully perceived in front of the Porte d'Aude at the pedestrian route from the Bastide. The circles of yellow colour consist of thin, painted aluminium sheets, spread like waves of time and space, fragmenting and recomposing the geometry of the circles on the towers and curtain walls of the fortifications. The work remained visible from May to September 2018 only.

References

External links 
 Home page (French)
 Artist's rationale (English)
 Interview and images (English)
 Critique by Joël Koskas(French;)
 Selection of perspective space paintings
 Felice Varini Year-By-Year: short chronology of works (English)

French conceptual artists
Swiss contemporary artists
1952 births
Living people
People from Locarno